Biswajeet Bora (born 8 August 1979) is an Indian filmmaker, producer writer & editor and one of the renowned filmmakers from Northeast India, now based in Mumbai. He made his directorial debut in Bollywood with the first Indian carbon neutral film Aisa Yeh Jahaan . The film is now currently available in Amazon Prime, Jio Cinema and Hotstar. He directed the Superhit Assamese film Bahniman which was released in 2016. He received the Golden Royal Bengal Tiger Trophy for Best Director at the National Competition Section: Competition on Indian Languages of 26th Kolkata International Film Festival 2021 for the film God on the Balcony. His film God on the Balcony received First Best Film in the Asian Cinema Competition at the prestigious 13th Bengaluru International Film Festival 2022. His latest film Boomba Ride made it to 'Indian Panorama' of the 52nd International Film Festival of India, Goa for the year 2021. Also, the film has been selected at the prestigious 26th International Film Festival of Kerala, 2021, 27th Kolkata International Film Festival 2021, 20th Pune International Film Festival 2022 and 20th Dhaka International Film Festival 2022.

His latest film Boomba Ride was among the 6 Indian films selected for screening at Cannes 2022 by the Ministry of Information & Broadcasting, India under Marche Du Film 2022.

Biography

Early life and education
Biswajeet was born in the village of No. 1 Senchowa, Golaghat, Assam, India, to Purna Chandra Bora and Monju Bora. He started his artistic life as an actor in amateur plays when he was 16. He later joined Evergreen Drama and Film Institute of Golaghat, to know about the craft. Also, he started playing martial arts at the age of 15. He received black belt in Martial Art in 1999. Later he shifted his base to film related writing in Assamese newspapers and also into direction and directed a few plays. After securing a degree in Assamese literature in 2001 from Golaghat Commerce College, he decided to go to Mumbai to pursue his career as a film editor.

Career
Initially, Biswajeet Bora wanted to be an actor and being from Assam, he started with theatre. He did a lot of work as an actor and also directed a few plays. Then he moved to Mumbai.  Coming to Mumbai he joined an editing studio and started working as an editor. Then he assisted internationally acclaimed filmmaker Jahnu Barua for several years before making films, including the Assamese film Ejak Jonakir Jhilmil (A Thousand Fireflies Sparkle) in 2007. In 2009 he made the documentary – Angel of the Aboriginals: Dr Verrier Elwin. This documentary has been selected to several international film festivals, including the Bollywood Beyond Film Festival in Germany and the IUAES (International Union of Anthropological and Ethnological Sciences) in Turkey. He made this first Hindi film titled Aisa Yeh Jahaan in 2015 which was India's first carbon neutral film. Later he forayed into commercial cinema in Assam with BAHNIMAN, which is one of the biggest hits in Assam. After that he made RAKTABEEZ, which was also a commercial hit. With his film PHEHUJALI, based on real life stories, he got critical acclaim and recognition in various international film festivals. 

He made his film God on the balcony during the covid19 time, it was first premiered at prestigious 26th Kolkata International Film Festival 2021 through this film he got world-wide recognition. Joseph Korkmaz, a professor of cinema history and film analysis at Saint Joseph University of Beirut - USJ, Lebanon wrote "The filmmaker portraits in his movie, a socio-economic context of a region, his own, that is a microcosm of an entire country that is struggling to develop. Will God who is on the balcony or in the sky and in the quivering nature accompany the father and his daughter who turn their backs on their poor reality and move away towards new horizons?" Shoma A. Chatterji, an Indian film scholar, author and freelance journalist, wrote on upperstall.com "God on the Balcony is yet another welcome addition to the wonderful cinema that is coming out from North-East India, especially from Assam, with regularity over the last few years. And is deserving of all the accolades it is accumulating."

Personal life
He now lives in Mumbai with his wife Lopamudra Gogoi Bora, who is also a writer and fashion designer and his son, Troy.

Filmography

Awards

 He received the 'Golden Royal Bengal Tiger Trophy' for 'Best Director' at the National Competition Section: Competition on Indian Languages of '26th Kolkata International Film Festival 2021'.
 God On the Balcony received Best Film in the Asian Cinema Competition at the prestigious 13th Bengaluru International Film Festival 2022' 'Equality in Cinema' award for 'God on The Balcony' at '12th Indian Film Festival of Melbourne, 2021' 'School Film of the Year' for 'God on the Balcony' at '18th Indian Film Festival, Stuttgart 2021'
 ''Honorable Mention' award for 'God on the Balcony' at 'Lasa international film Festival, Brazil 2021
 'Special Mention' award for ' 'God on the Balcony' at '22nd Rainbow Film Festival, 2021'
 Received Best Actor Jury Award (Harsih Khanna) for the film 'God on the Balcony' at '10th Annual DC South Asian Film Festival, USA, 2021'.
 'Best Feature Film' award 'God on the Balcony' at '8th Rajasthan International Film Festival, 2021'
 He received the Best Director award from Assam Talks (a news channel of Assam) for his Assamese Film Bahniman in 2016.
 His Hindi film 'Aisa Yeh Jahaan' won the 'Best Feature Film 2017' at '4th Arunachal Film Festival' by the Government of Arunachal Pradesh, Film Federation.
'Aisa Yeh Jahaan' won the ‘International Award of Excellence 2015’ at the esteemed ‘INTERNATIONAL FILM AWARDS FOR ENVIRONMENT, HEALTH & CULTURE 2015’ Indonesia.
'Best Actor' award for the film 'Pehujali' at ''Sailadhar Baruah Film Festival, Guwahati,'

Nominations 

 'Best Director' (God On The Balcony) at 12th Indian Film Festival of Melbourne, 2021
 'Best Indie Film' (God On The Balcony) at 12th Indian Film Festival of Melbourne, 2021
 'Best Actor' (God On The Balcony) at 12th Indian Film Festival of Melbourne, 2021
 'German Star of India' (God On The Balcony) at 18th Indian Film Festival, Stuttgart, 2021
 'Best Actor' (God On The Balcony) at 19th New York Indian Film Festival , 2021
 'Best Child Actor' (God On The Balcony) at 19th New York Indian Film Festival , 2021

Festivals 

 Indian Panorama 2021 of the 52nd International film Festival of India, (BOOMBA RIDE)
26th International film Festival of India, Kerala 2022, (BOOMBA RIDE)
27th Kolkata International film Festival, 2022, (BOOMBA RIDE)
20th Dhaka International film Festival, 2022, (BOOMBA RIDE)
24th Shanghai International film festival, 2021, (GOD ON THE BALCONY)
 25th International Film Festival of Kerala, 2021, (GOD ON THE BALCONY)
 19th Dhaka International film festival, 2021, (GOD ON THE BALCONY)
 26th Kolkata International Film Festival, 2021, (GOD ON THE BALCONY)
 21st Imagine India International film festival, Madrid, 2021(GOD ON THE BALCONY)
 19th Dhaka International Film Festival (DIFF), 2021, (GOD ON THE BALCONY)
20th Dhaka International Film Festival (DIFF), 2022, (GOD ON THE BALCONY)
 17th Dhaka International Film Festival (DIFF), 2018 (Phehujali)
 12th Indian Film Festival of Melbourne, 2022, (GOD ON THE BALCONY)
 18th Indian Film Festival, Stuttgart, 2021, (GOD ON THE BALCONY)
 19th New York Indian Film Festival, 2021, (GOD ON THE BALCONY)
 22nd Rainbow Film Festival, London, 2021, (GOD ON THE BALCONY)
 19th Pune International Film Festival, 202, (GOD ON THE BALCONY)
 Lasa international film Festival, Brazil 2021, (GOD ON THE BALCONY)
 8th Rajasthan International Film Festival, 202, (GOD ON THE BALCONY)
Asian Film Festival Barcelona, 2021, (GOD ON THE BALCONY)
10th Annual DC South Asian Film Festival, USA, 2021, (GOD ON THE BALCONY)
3rd Guwahati International Film Festival, 2018 (Phehujali)
Jagran Film Festival, 2018 (Phehujali)
Third Eye Asian Film Festival, 2017 (Phehujali)
Third Eye Asian Film Festival, 2008 (A thousand fireflies sparkle)
Fragrances from the Northeast, Film festival by Directorate of Film Festivals, Delhi 2015 (Aisa Yeh Jahaan)

References

 https://scroll.in/reel/993207/in-assamese-film-god-on-the-balcony-a-snapshot-of-death-caused-by-governmental-apathy
 https://thenewsmill.com/god-on-the-balcony-film-review-joseph-korkmaz/
 https://www.eastmojo.com/entertainment/2021/06/24/biswajeet-boras-god-on-the-balcony-to-be-screened-at-stuttgart-film-festival/
 https://upperstall.com/film/god-on-the-balcony/
 https://scroll.in/reel/1006586/assamese-film-boomba-ride-captures-the-seriocomic-state-of-rural-education
 https://www.dailyexcelsior.com/educating-boomba/

Living people
Hindi-language film directors
Assamese-language film directors
Film directors from Assam
21st-century Indian film directors
1979 births